The woolly mouse opossum or long-furred woolly mouse opossum (Marmosa demerarae), known locally as the cuíca, is a South American marsupial of the family Didelphidae. Its range includes central Colombia, Venezuela, French Guiana, Guyana, Suriname, eastern Peru, northern Bolivia, and northern Brazil. It was formerly assigned to the genus Micoureus, which was made a subgenus of Marmosa in 2009.

It generally lives in tropical, humid forest below 1,200 meter elevation as in the Andes and surrounding lowlands. It is often found on plantations or other disturbed areas as well as evergreen forests.

References 

Woolly mouse opossum
Fauna of the Amazon
Marsupials of South America
Mammals of Brazil
Mammals of Colombia
Mammals of French Guiana
Mammals of Guyana
Mammals of Paraguay
Mammals of Suriname
Mammals of Venezuela
Taxa named by Oldfield Thomas
Mammals described in 1905